¡Mucha Lucha! is an American animated television series created by Eddie Mort and Lili Chin. Set in the fictional Southern California town of Luchaville, a location so heavily influenced by lucha libre that nearly every resident has their own mask, costume, and signature move, the series follows young adolescents Rikochet, Buena Girl, and the Flea and their studies at the Foremost World-Renowned International School of Lucha.

The series premiered on The WB's Saturday-morning cartoon block Kids' WB on August 17, 2002, and ran for 3 seasons totaling 52 episodes. The series' third season title was changed to ¡Mucha Lucha!: Gigante, which aired its final episode, the series finale, on February 26, 2005. A straight-to-video movie titled ¡Mucha Lucha!: The Return of El Maléfico was released on January 4, 2005.

Series overview

Episodes

Season 1 (2002–03)
Note: All episodes in this season are directed by Alfred Gimeno.

Season 2 (2003–05)
Note: From episode 14 to the end of the series, all episodes were directed by Ken Kessel.

¡Mucha Lucha!: Gigante, Season 3 (2004–05)
Note: The theme song from Chicos de Barrio was changed in this season. The last four episodes of season 2 were held over and ended up airing during season 3.

Direct-to-Video Movie (2005)

External links
 List of ¡Mucha Lucha! episodes at Epguides

Mucha Lucha!
¡Mucha Lucha!